Unoaku Anyadike (born Unoaku Temitope Anyadike on September 16, 1994) is a Nigerian model and beauty pageant titleholder who was crowned as the winner of the 2015 edition of the Most Beautiful Girl in Nigeria pageant.

Personal life
Born into a middle-class family to an Igbo father and a Yoruba mother, both educators in Osun State, southwestern Nigeria; Unoaku is an alumna of the University of Ibadan where she studied psychology.

Pageantry

Most Beautiful Girl in Nigeria 2014
Unoaku contested at the 2014 edition of the Most Beautiful Girl in Nigeria representing Lagos State.

Most Beautiful Girl in Nigeria 2015
On October 24, 2015, while representing Anambra State, Unoaku was crowned winner of the 2015 edition of the Most Beautiful Girl in Nigeria that was held at the Calabar International Convention Centre. She represented Nigeria at the Miss World 2015 pageant held in China.

Miss Universe 2016
She represented Nigeria at the Miss Universe 2016 pageant but Unplaced.

References

External links
Unoaku Anyadike on Most Beautiful Girl in Nigeria

Miss World 2015 delegates
1994 births
Living people
Most Beautiful Girl in Nigeria winners
University of Ibadan alumni
Igbo beauty pageant contestants
Yoruba beauty pageant contestants
Miss Universe 2016 contestants
Igbo people